Saher Stadium is a multi-purpose stadium in Tovuz, Azerbaijan.  It is currently used mostly for football matches and is the home stadium of PFC Turan Tovuz. The stadium holds 6,800 people.

Football venues in Azerbaijan
Multi-purpose stadiums in Azerbaijan
Turan-Tovuz IK
Sports venues completed in 1979
1979 establishments in Azerbaijan